Christopher Olivier (born March 27, 1992) is an American professional basketball player for Shonan United BC in Japan.

Career statistics 

|-
| align="left" | 2017-18
| align="left" | Kagoshima/Yamagata
|47 ||16 || 26.0 ||.611  || .182 ||.655 || 10.0 || 1.3 || 0.6 ||1.2  || 22.7
|-

References

1992 births
Living people
American expatriate basketball people in Georgia (country)
American expatriate basketball people in Japan
American expatriate basketball people in Kosovo
American men's basketball players
Eastern Illinois Panthers men's basketball players
Iwate Big Bulls players
Kagoshima Rebnise players
Kumamoto Volters players
Oklahoma State Cowboys basketball players
Passlab Yamagata Wyverns players
Power forwards (basketball)
Tokyo Cinq Rêves players
Tryhoop Okayama players
KB Ylli players